WYLK (94.7 FM), also known as Lake 94.7, is a hot adult contemporary radio station serving the St. Tammany Parish area. Owned by former Mississippi congressman C. Wayne Dowdy under the company name North Shore Broadcasting Co., Inc., the station is licensed to Lacombe, Louisiana, and broadcasts at 94.7 MHz with an ERP of 2,900 watts.

History

1996 to 2001
Charles K. And Carlie B. Winstanley were the founders of "Lake Radio" WYLA-FM 94.7 first came on the air in 1996, and the format was country. The station simulcast with WYLK-FM 104.7  of Folsom, as a country combo known as "94.7/104.7 the Lake".

Styles Broadcasting bought the stations in 1999 from Charles K.& Carlie B. Winstanley (The Radio Company), who were the  founders and original owners of both stations. Winstanley also owned stations WPCF-FM & WDLP in Panama City, Florida along with WQXY 100.7 in Baton Rouge in the late 1960s. Winstanley also owned an interest in KCIL/KJIN in Houma plus interests in other radio properties in the Southeast. While 104.7 moved to a Smooth Jazz format as "Shore 104.7", 94.7 continued as a country station. However, it now simulcasted with WSJZ 94.9 out of Reserve, as "K94"; the station was a successful country simulcast to the New Orleans market. This lasted until 2000, when 94.9 was flipped to the Smooth Jazz format itself. 104.7 was eventually divested to C. Wayne Dowdy that same year. 94.7 returned to simulcasting 94.9, albeit with the Smooth Jazz format, in January 2001.

2001 to 2010
Later in 2001, Wilks Broadcasting assumed control of the stations, eventually purchasing them in 2002. In December 2001, 94.7 and 94.9 were flipped to a Hot Talk/Active Rock format as "94.9 Extreme Radio". This format lasted until November 2002, as the loss of the syndicated Opie & Anthony show, as well as Wilks' acquisition of Modern Rocker "106.7 the End", caused the stations to flip to a Gospel format as "Praise 94.9".

Citadel purchased the combo of 94's in 2003. Only to divest them to C. Wayne Dowdy's Southeastern Broadcasting company in early 2005. Pittman Broadcasting had announced the purchase of the combo the year before, only to back out due to concerns over tower space for 94.7 because of the state of Louisiana building an interchange for I-10 in the area where the signal is located.

Dowdy continued to broadcast the Gospel format until Hurricane Katrina. After the storm, 94.7 was shifted to "Radio Slidell", providing disaster information for the citizens of Slidell.

In November 2005, the "Praise" simulcast was officially broken up, as 94.7 switched to a commercial-free format of Hot Adult Contemporary music. This continued until December 31, 2005, when 94.7 took on the name of "Lake 94.7" and  programmed a format local to St. Tammany Parish.

"Lake 94.7" is run out of Dowdy's North Shore Broadcasting studios. The programming office is located in Hammond, Louisiana and the station operates a sales office in Covington, Louisiana. The tower is located in Slidell, Louisiana, where it shares space on the tower of AM station WSLA; however, the station plans to move its signal to Lacombe, Louisiana. The current tower had been flooded by Hurricane Katrina; before the storm, the transmitter had already been prone to problems.

2011 to present
As of October 2011, FCC records indicate that the  WYLK transmitter is located just off Fish Hatchery Road, north of Lacombe. Northshore Broadcasting studios are located on Highway 190, near I-12.

External links
Lake 94.7's website
Lake 94.7 on Facebook 
Transmitter Location 

WYLK
Radio stations established in 1996